Amboy may refer to:

Places 
 Amboy, Córdoba, village in Calamuchita Department, Córdoba province, Argentina

United States 
 Amboy Crater, feature in Mojave National Preserve, California

Settled U.S. places
 Amboy, California
 Amboy, Georgia
 Amboy, Illinois 
 Amboy, Indiana
 Amboy, Minnesota
 Amboy, Nebraska
 New Jersey:
 Perth Amboy, New Jersey
 South Amboy, New Jersey
 The Amboys, area of New Jersey that includes both Perth Amboy and South Amboy
 Amboy, New York
 Amboy, Washington

Other uses
 Amboy (ship)

See also
Amboy Township (disambiguation)
 The Amboy Dukes